The Ahmedabad–Allahabad Weekly Superfast Express is a Superfast train belonging to Western Railway zone that runs between  and  in India. It is currently being operated with 22967/22968 train numbers on a weekly basis.

Service

The 22967/Ahmedabad–Allahabad Weekly Superfast Express has an average speed of 56 km/hr and covers 1483 km in 26h 40m. The 22968/Allahabad–Ahmedabad Weekly Superfast Express has an average speed of 55 km/hr and covers 1483 km in 27h.

Route and halts 

The important halts of the train are:

Coach composition

The train has standard LHB rakes with a max speed of 130 kmph. The train consists of 18 coaches:

 1 AC II Tier
 2 AC III Tier
 7 Sleeper coaches
 6 General Unreserved
 2 Seating cum Luggage Rake

Traction

Both trains are hauled by a Vadodara Loco Shed-based WAP-4E or Itarsi Loco Shed-based WAP-4 electric locomotive from Ahmedabad to Itarsi. From Itarsi the train is hauled by a Samastipur Loco Shed-based WDM-3A or WDM-3D diesel locomotive to Allahabad, and vice versa.

Direction reversal

The train shares its rake with 19415/19416 Ahmedabad–Shri Mata Vaishno Devi Katra Express.

See also 

 Allahabad Junction railway station
 Ahmedabad Junction railway station
 Ahmedabad–Shri Mata Vaishno Devi Katra Express

Notes

References

External links 

 22967/Ahmedabad - Allahabad Weekly SF Express India Rail Info
 22968/Allahabad - Ahmedabad Weekly SF Express India Rail Info

Transport in Ahmedabad
Trains from Allahabad
Express trains in India
Rail transport in Madhya Pradesh
Rail transport in Gujarat
Railway services introduced in 2014